The Clements Center for National Security is a nonpartisan policy and research center at the University of Texas at Austin. The center is named after former Texas Governor and Deputy Secretary of Defense Bill Clements. The goal of the Clements Center is to teach diplomatic and military history to undergraduates and graduate students, as well as support research in the topics of history, strategy, and national security policy.

Leadership 
 William Inboden, Executive Director
 Paul Edgar, Associate Director
 Steve Slick, Intelligence Studies Project Director
 Mark Lawrence, Director of Graduate Studies

References

External links 
 Main website

University of Texas at Austin
Research institutes in Texas
Research institutes of international relations
Security studies
Nonpartisan organizations in the United States
United States national security policy
Foreign policy and strategy think tanks in the United States